Rudolf "Tito" Warnholtz (17 February 1906 – 12 January 1993) was a German field hockey player who competed in the 1936 Summer Olympics.

He was a member of the German field hockey team, which won the silver medal. He played one match as goalkeeper.

External links
 
profile

1906 births
1993 deaths
German male field hockey players
Olympic field hockey players of Germany
Field hockey players at the 1936 Summer Olympics
Olympic silver medalists for Germany
Olympic medalists in field hockey
Medalists at the 1936 Summer Olympics
20th-century German people